Bandbal-e Pain (also Romanized as Bandbāl-e Pā'īn) is a village in Qeblehi Rural District, in the Central District of Dezful County, Khuzestan Province, Iran. At the 2006 census, its population was 939, in 205 families.

References 

Populated places in Dezful County